William Catlyn (1628–1709) was a Hull architect who worked in the local Artisan Mannerist style,  also known as the Humber  Brick style.  His work, which was greatly influenced by Dutch architecture of the period, survives mainly in Hull and Lincolnshire.

Architectural work

Wilberforce House, Hull (attributed to Catlyn)
A merchants house, backing onto the river. Its nine-bay rusticated brick front has pilasters to the first floor, stone corinthian capitals and a three-storey porch, with indented pilasters decorated with lozenge-and diamond shaped stone ‘‘jewels’’.

Crowle House, Hull.
Dated 1664  and the remaining parts are similar to Wilberforce House.

The Charterhouse, Hull
Catlyn built the Master’s House and Chapel in 1673.

Hull Guildhall
‘‘Beautified’’ by Catlyn in 1681-2. Destroyed during World War II

Hull Market Cross
Built 1682 and destroyed during World War II

Crowle Hospital, Sewer Lane, Hull

Brigg Grammar School, Wrawby Street,  Brigg, Lincolnshire 1674

Sir John Nelthorpe  commissioned this school from William Catlyn and the contract for building the school was drawn up on 4 July 1674 and it was completed in 1678. A tall, single storeyed front of seven bays and stone quoins. The centre emphasised by Ionic pilasters and stone capitals. The entrance door has a moulded stone round-headed architrave with a small keystone with a cherub's head. Brick pilasters with a plinth and Roman Ionic capitals in stone. Central achievement of arms in stone frame above an inscription commemorating foundation by Sir John Nelthorpe. Modern brick modillion pediment above.

Worlaby Hospital, Worlaby, Lincolnshire

Built for John, Lord Bellasis, the Governor of Hull. The front is of five bays and two storeys, divided by giant Doric pilasters.  Flat projecting surrounds and strange hoods to the doors and to the ground-floor windows. There is a large studded cornice. The building originally had Dutch gables. The Foundation was for four poor widows.

Harrington Hall, Lincolnshire (attributed to Catlyn) 

It has been suggested that alterations to the Hall, which were re-built from 1673, were by William Catlyn. The old porch was dressed up with an Artisan Mannerist facade of exceedingly elongated brick pilasters with Ionic capitals

Walcot Old Hall, Alkborough, Lincolnshire. (attributed to Catlyn)

Built for a Hull merchant, Nicholas Denman.

References

Literature
Antram N (revised), Pevsner N & Harris J, (1989), The Buildings of England: Lincolnshire, Yale University Press.
Colvin H. (1995), A Biographical Dictionary of British Architects 1600–1840 Yale University Press, 3rd edition London.
Louw H.J. (1981), ‘‘Anglo-Netherlandish architectural interchange, c.1600-c.1660’’, Architectural History, Vol. 24, pp. 1–23.  
Neave D. (1996) Artisan Mannerism in North Lincolnshire and East Yorkshire: The work of William Catlyn (1628–1709) of Hull in Sturman C (ed) Lincolnshire Peoples and Places: Essays in Memory of Terence R. Leach (1937–1994), pp. 18–25.
 N Pevsner and D. Neave, The Buildings of England: Yorkshire: York and the East Riding, Yale.

External links

1628 births
1709 deaths
Architects from Kingston upon Hull
17th-century English architects